The Centre for Social Responsibility in Mining (CSRM) is a member of the Sustainable Minerals Institute at the University of Queensland.

CSRM was established in 2001 as a research centre committed to improving the social performance of the global resource industry through independent research, training and professional development, participation in multi-stakeholder dialogue processes, and student research for higher degrees. In 2022, it had 40 staff and postgraduate students. Undergraduate programs are not offered.

CSRM's focus is on the social, cultural, economic, and political challenges accompanying mineral resource extraction and on questions of justice, fairness, and equity. CSRM staff engage with industry, communities, and Indigenous and land-connected peoples alike. The centre has a worldwide research interests, with recent publications on mining issues in Australia, Brazil, Canada, China, Cook Islands, Czech Republic, India, Indonesia, Madagascar, Papua New Guinea, Peru, Philippines, South Africa, and Suriname.

Notable people

Saleem Ali (academic) – Director, 2012–2015.
David Brereton – Director, 2001–2012.
Martha Macintyre – Australian anthropologist, Honorary Professor.

References

External links
CSRM homepage

Mining organisations in Australia
Mining in Queensland
Land management in Australia